Bodo Hell (born 15 March 1943 in Salzburg)  is an Austrian writer. He studied the organ with  the Mozarteum, Salzburg, and in Vienna he studied Film and Television, Philosophy, German Studies and History. He lives in Vienna and Dachstein, Styria. He has worked with, among others, Friederike Mayröcker, Ernst Jandl, Liesl Ujvary and Hil de Gard.

References

1943 births
Living people
Austrian male writers